The 2021 Tver Oblast gubernatorial election was held on 17–19 September 2021, on common election day, coinciding with election to the State Duma. Incumbent Governor Igor Rudenya was reelected for his second term.

Background
Igor Rudenya became Governor of Tver Oblast in March 2016 replacing first-term Governor Andrey Shevelyov. Rudenya previously served as general director of CJSC "Roszerno" (1996-2002, 2012-2016) and Deputy Minister of Agriculture (2005-2007). Igor Rudenya won 2016 gubernatorial election with 72.13% of the vote.

Governor Rudenya since 2009 was considered for the post of Minister of Agriculture, the rumours again floated in 2021. Ultimately he decided to run for another term.

Candidates
Only political parties can nominate candidates for gubernatorial election in Tver Oblast, self-nomination is not possible. However, candidate is not obliged to be a member of the nominating party. Candidate for Governor of Tver Oblast should be a Russian citizen and at least 30 years old. Candidates for Governor should not have a foreign citizenship or residence permit. Each candidate in order to be registered is required to collect at least 7% of signatures of members and heads of municipalities (175-183 signatures). Also gubernatorial candidates present 3 candidacies to the Federation Council and election winner later appoints one of the presented candidates.

Registered candidates
Oleg Gorlov (LDPR), advisor to Vladimir Zhirinovsky for economic affairs
Dmitry Ignatkov (SR-ZP), Member of Tver City Duma
Ilya Kleymenov (Communists of Russia), Member of Konakovsky District Assembly of Deputies, first secretary of CPCR regional committee, 2016 gubernatorial candidate
Igor Rudenya (United Russia), incumbent Governor of Tver Oblast
Lyudmila Vorobyova (CPRF), Member of Legislative Assembly of Tver Oblast

Declined
Aleksey Chepa (SR-ZP), Member of State Duma (running for re-election)
Pavel Grudinin (CPRF), director of CJSC "Lenin Sovkhoz", 2018 Russian presidential candidate (ran for State Duma but was disqualified)
Anton Morozov (LDPR), Member of State Duma, 2016 gubernatorial candidate (running for re-election and for Federation Council)

Candidates for the Federation Council
Incumbent Senator Vladimir Lukin (Independent) was not renominated.
Oleg Gorlov (LDPR):
Leonid Bulatov, member of Tver City Duma, aide to State Duma member Anton Morozov
Dmitry Karpov, member of Konakovsky District Assembly of Deputies, aide to State Duma member Anton Morozov
Anton Morozov, member of State Duma, 2016 gubernatorial candidate
Dmitry Ignatkov (SR-ZP):
Eduard Belykh, member of Legislative Assembly of Tver Oblast
Gennady Chukhovin, manager for sales at IP Romanova O.Z.
Aleksey Tikhomirov, member of Kalininsky District Assembly of Deputies, aide to State Duma member Aleksey Chepa
Ilya Kleymenov (Communists of Russia):
Vera Bogacheva, pensioner
Mikhail Noin, second secretary of CPCR regional committee
Aleksey Vakhalin, member of Shcherbininskoye, Kalininsky District Council of Deputies
Igor Rudenya (United Russia):
Lyudmila Skakovskaya, rector of Tver State University
Andrey Yepishin,  Senator of the Federation Council (from the Legislative Assembly of Tver Oblast)
Sergey Zhuravlyov, Head of Staritsky District
Lyudmila Vorobyova (CPRF):
Andrey Istomin, member of Legislative Assembly of Tver Oblast
Dmitry Petrov, director of LLP "Auris"
Aleksey Plyukhin, assistant in radio-biology, Tver State University

Results

|- style="background-color:#E9E9E9;text-align:center;"
! style="text-align:left;" colspan=2| Candidate
! style="text-align:left;"| Party
! width="75"|Votes
! width="30"|%
|-
| style="background-color:;"|
| style="text-align:left;"| Igor Rudenya (incumbent)
| style="text-align:left;"| United Russia
| 225,020
| 52.33
|-
| style="background-color:;"|
| style="text-align:left;"| Lyudmila Vorobyova
| style="text-align:left;"| Communist Party
| 86,389
| 20.09
|-
| style="background-color:;"|
| style="text-align:left;"| Dmitry Ignatkov
| style="text-align:left;"| A Just Russia — For Truth
| 45,981
| 10.69
|-
| style="background-color:;"|
| style="text-align:left;"| Oleg Gorlov
| style="text-align:left;"| Liberal Democratic Party
| 28,022
| 6.52
|-
| style="background-color:;"|
| style="text-align:left;"| Ilya Kleymenov
| style="text-align:left;"| Communists of Russia
| 27,089
| 6.30
|-
| style="text-align:left;" colspan="3"| Valid votes
| 412,501
| 95.93
|-
| style="text-align:left;" colspan="3"| Blank ballots
| 17,503
| 4.07
|- style="font-weight:bold"
| style="text-align:left;" colspan="3"| Total
| 430,004
| 100.00
|-
| style="background-color:#E9E9E9;" colspan="6"|
|-
| style="text-align:left;" colspan="3"| Turnout
| 430,004
| 41.69
|-
| style="text-align:left;" colspan="3"| Registered voters
| 1,031,402
| 100.00
|-
| colspan="5" style="background-color:#E9E9E9;"|
|- style="font-weight:bold"
| colspan="4" |Source:
|
|}

Tver State University rector Lyudmila Skakovskaya (United Russia) was appointed to the Federation Council replacing incumbent Senator Vladimir Lukin (Independent).

References

Tver Oblast
September 2021 events in Russia
Politics of Tver Oblast